Bambalina consorta is a moth of the family Psychidae first described by Robert Templeton in 1847. It is found in Sri Lanka.

References

Moths of Asia
Moths described in 1847
Psychidae
Taxa named by Robert Templeton